Hypocalymma linifolium is a member of the family Myrtaceae endemic to Western Australia.

It is found in a small area along the west coast in the Wheatbelt region of Western Australia centred around Dandaragan where it grows in sandy soils.

References

linifolium
Endemic flora of Western Australia
Critically endangered flora of Australia
Rosids of Western Australia
Plants described in 1862
Taxa named by Nikolai Turczaninow